is a Japanese former professional boxer who was sentenced to death on September 11, 1968, for a 1966 mass murder that became known as the Hakamada Incident.  On March 10, 2011, Guinness World Records certified Hakamada as the world’s longest-held death row inmate. In March 2014, he was granted a retrial and an immediate release when the Shizuoka district court found there was reason to believe evidence against him had been falsified.

Early life and boxing career
Iwao Hakamada was born March 10, 1936, in Shizuoka City, Japan. He has an older sister, Hideko; his older brother Shigeji died in 2001.  From 1959 to 1961, Hakamada fought in 29 professional boxing matches. A featherweight, he was ranked as high as sixth in his weight class. He finished his career with a 16–11–2 record, including one win by TKO. All of his losses were on points. After his boxing career, he worked at a Shizuoka-based miso manufacturer.

Incident and trial
On June 30, 1966, there was a fire at the home of one of Hakamada's bosses. According to Hakamada, he helped extinguish the fire only to find the bodies of the executive, his wife, and two children, all stabbed to death. About ¥200,000 in cash was stolen from the victims' residence.

Hakamada was interrogated and, in August 1966, he was arrested based on his confession and a tiny amount of blood and gasoline found on a pair of pajamas he owned.  According to his lawyers, Hakamada was interrogated a total of 264 hours, for as many as 16 hours a session, over 23 days to obtain the confession. They added that he was denied water or toilet breaks during the interrogation.

At his trial, Hakamada retracted the confession, saying police had kicked and clubbed him to obtain it, and pleaded not guilty. 
"I could do nothing but crouch down on the floor trying to keep from defecating," he later told his sister. "One of the interrogators put my thumb onto an ink pad, drew it to a written confession record and ordered me, 'Write your name here!' [while] shouting at me, kicking me and wrenching my arm."Prosecutors put aside the pajamas and instead presented five pieces of bloody clothing that were found in a tank at the miso factory in August 1967, 14 months after the crime. They argued that the clothing came from the killer and said police had found the blood types of the victims on the clothing.  They argued that Hakamada must have murdered the family in these clothes and then changed into pajamas to commit the arson. Hakamada supporters said the case was full of holes, arguing that the alleged murder weapon – a fruit knife with a  blade – could not have withstood the forty stabbings of the victims without sustaining significant damage, and that the pajamas used to justify the arrest had disappeared and been replaced with the bloody clothing. The clothes were too small for Hakamada but the prosecution argued they had shrunk in the miso tank and the label had a "B" or medium size label on it which would have fitted Hakamada. However the B indicated the colour Black not the size.  The blood stains on the clothes were too dark and the colour of the clothes too light to have been lying in the miso tank.

The Shizuoka District Court discounted part of Hakamada's confession and chided the police for their interrogation tactics. But, on September 11, 1968, the three-judge panel found Hakamada guilty and sentenced him to death.  The Japan Pro Boxing Association alleged that prejudice against boxers was involved, and said the principle of innocent until proven guilty had been violated because of rampant press reports declaring Hakamada guilty.  A subsequent appeal to the Tokyo High Court was denied and the Supreme Court of Japan upheld the death sentence on November 11, 1980. Hakamada maintained his innocence, writing to his son in 1983: "I will prove to you that your dad never killed anybody, and it is the police who know it best and it is the judges who feel sorry. I will break this iron chain and return to you."  Although Hakamada remained on death row, he was not executed because the Minister of Justice refused to sign his death warrant, suspecting that the conviction was not certain. Like most death row inmates, Hakamada was placed in solitary confinement throughout his prison stay. He was not permitted to talk to guards, and rarely allowed visitors.

Campaign for a retrial
After his appeal was denied in 1980, Hakamada obtained a new team of lawyers. In 1981, they filed a request for a retrial, asking for the physical evidence to be re-examined. In the investigation, it was determined the alleged murder weapon was the wrong size to produce the stab wounds, that a door supposedly used to enter the home was actually locked, and that the bloody pants were too small to have been worn by Hakamada. Backed by the Japanese Federation of Bar Associations (JFBA), Hakamada's lawyers concluded the first trial had failed to establish that any of the clothing belonged to him. After 13 years of gathering evidence, the request was heard and denied by the Shizuoka District Court on August 9, 1994.  In 2000, an attempt was made to extract DNA from the bloody clothing, but available techniques did not allow for any to be detected.  The Tokyo High Court upheld the retrial denial on August 27, 2004.

In November 2006, 500 supporters including world champion boxers Koichi Wajima and Katsuo Tokashiki submitted letters to the Supreme Court asking for a retrial.  In March 2007, Norimichi Kumamoto, one of the three judges who had originally convicted Hakamada, came out in support of Hakamada's innocence. He stated that he had doubted the authenticity of the confession and believed Hakamada to be innocent. However, he had failed to persuade his two more senior colleagues, resulting in the split judgment for conviction.  He eventually resigned his position out of guilt for the conviction. The revelation came in spite of a strong tradition against revealing the discussions between judges, and it resulted in Kumamoto being highly criticized. "I'm glad I spoke up", he said. "I wish I had said it earlier, and maybe something might have changed." He tried to visit Hakamada in prison to apologize personally, but his request was denied.

After Kumamoto's statement, a campaign to retry Hakamada gained momentum. Amnesty International and the Japan Pro Boxing Association led the cause. American boxer Rubin Carter, who served 20 years on murder charges that were eventually overturned, and British actor Jeremy Irons spoke out on Hakamada's behalf. A charity rally organized by the Pro Boxing Association attracted 1300 supporters. Kumamoto personally submitted a statement to the Supreme Court in support of a retrial. The high court elected to hear Hakamada's request in 2008. On March 25, 2008, the high court denied the request, stating that neither the original or new evidence provided any reasonable doubt of Hakamada's guilt. One of the boxer's lawyers, Hideyo Ogawa, said it was a regrettable "decision handed down without much thought".  The JFBA called the decision an extremely deplorable miscarriage of justice.

In April 2010, 57 members of parliament formed the "Federation of Diet Members to Save the Condemned Iwao Hakamada".  The group was chaired by Seishu Makino and included members of multiple political parties.  They petitioned the Minister of Justice to introduce a moratorium on the execution of Hakamada.  Also in 2010, director Banmei Takahashi released BOX: The Hakamada Case (BOX　袴田事件　命とは).  The documentary film contrasts the lives of Hakamada and Kumamoto, focusing on Hakamada's interrogation and trial.  The film concludes that Kumamoto was forced to "bury the truth" when it became obvious that the evidence was not sufficient to convict.  The movie was nominated for the Grand Prix des Amériques at the Montreal World Film Festival.

On March 10, 2011, Hakamada's 75th birthday, Guinness World Records certified him as the world's longest-held death row inmate.

DNA tests and release
A 2008 DNA test suggested the blood on the clothing used as evidence did not match Hakamada's, prompting a second retrial request from his lawyers. Further tests in 2011 supported the conclusion.  On March 14, 2012, a blood sample was taken from Hakamada for a more accurate DNA test to compare with the blood sample on the shoulder of the T-shirt found among the murderer's clothes. The blood was thought to be that of the attacker, and had been previously determined unlikely to be from any of the victims.  The testing revealed that the blood did not match Hakamada's DNA.  The prosecution disputed the validity of the DNA tests.

On March 27, 2014, Hakamada was released from prison and granted a retrial by the Shizuoka District Court. A statement from the court said there was reason to believe evidence had been fabricated in the original trial and that keeping the 78-year-old jailed while waiting on the retrial would have been "unbearably unjust". Amnesty International remarked, "Time is running out for Hakamada to receive the fair trial he was denied more than four decades ago. If ever there was a case that merits a retrial, this is it."  A prosecution appeal of the decision to release Hakamada was denied.  Hakamada is the sixth Japanese death row inmate to be granted a retrial.  Four of the previous five were eventually acquitted.

According to a family member, Hakamada's mental health has badly deteriorated due to years in solitary confinement. According to an anti-death penalty activist that visited him in 2003, Hakamada was then claiming he had become "the omnipotent God" who had "absorbed" Iwao Hakamada, taken over the prison, and abolished the death penalty in Japan. A 2009 report on the death penalty in Japan by Amnesty International said a psychiatrist had diagnosed Hakamada with "institutional psychosis". In recent years, he had denied most visitation requests, including from family. Hakamada was admitted to a Tokyo hospital the day after his release to be treated for a possible case of diabetes.

In June 2018, the Tokyo High Court overturned the ruling that had Hakamada released.  He was allowed to retain his freedom due to his age until the case returns to the Supreme Court.  That August the nation's highest prosecutors' office exhorted the Supreme Court to reject Hakamada's appeal to "stop the situation in which the sentence is suspended unnecessarily".

On 13 March 2023, a re-trial was ordered for Hakamada per the ruling of the Tokyo High Court.

Impact
When Kumamoto came out in support of Hakamada in 2007, it shocked the Japanese public, casting light on the usually secretive justice system. Hakamada's case caused people to question the validity of the death penalty and brought attention to what critics describe as "inhumane" elements of the Japanese justice system. In Japan, the police may interrogate a suspect for up to 23 days, and the suspect is not permitted to have a lawyer present during interrogation. Because a false confession could be obtained easily under such harsh conditions, and because it was legal before WWII for police to torture suspects to obtain a confession, Japanese criminal courts will admit a confession as evidence only when a secret known by the perpetrator of the crime is contained therein. Moreover, Japanese courts do not permit guilty pleas; and so, even if the accused declares guilt, the courts may find the defendant innocent if the confession of guilt is determined to be inadequate.

In capital punishment cases, to rule out the possibility that police may have forced a confession, the secret must be something that the police investigation did not discover at the time of the confession. Moreover, supervision by the prosecutor, to maintain the record of investigation, is considered the cornerstone of validity of confession as evidence. Due to its reliance on confession as evidence and proof of guilt, Japanese police put enormous pressure on the suspect to confess a guilty secret as this kind of confession is regarded as strong as forensic evidence. The vast majority of miscarriage of justice cases, in Japanese capital punishment cases, involve police faking the investigative record to make it appear as if the suspect confessed certain guilty secrets, which only the perpetrator of the crime could have known and it later became apparent that the suspect was being forced to sign a completely blank confession paper which the investigative police filled in for their convenience.

Amnesty International has featured Hakamada prominently in their campaign against the death penalty in Japan. Using his case and others, they argued "Japan's death row system is driving prisoners into the depths of mental illness".  The JFBA said the case is an example of "a nest of unlawful interrogations" and called for reform, including video taping of all interrogations.

See also

Capital punishment in Japan
Matsuo Fujimoto
Sadamichi Hirasawa
Sakae Menda
Rubin Carter
Sayama Incident

References

External links
 Hakamada.net
Death Penalty – Japan: Dissenting Judge Breaks 40-Year Silence Inter Press Service
An Epic Miscarriage of Justice Japan Times opinion piece.
Data Base of Wrongful Convictions in Japan

1936 births
Japanese people convicted of murder
Japanese prisoners sentenced to death
Living people
People convicted of murder by Japan
People from Shizuoka (city)
Prisoners sentenced to death by Japan
Japanese male boxers
Sportspeople from Shizuoka Prefecture
Sportspeople convicted of crimes
Featherweight boxers